David Bateson (born 9 February 1960) is a British actor and comedian. He is best known for providing the voice of Agent 47, the protagonist of IO Interactive's stealth video game series Hitman, having played the role since the year 2000 in each of the franchise's eight main games. He has also served as a voice for commercials advertising various Lego brands.

Biography
Bateson was born on 9 February 1960, in Durban, South Africa, to English parents. He entered the acting profession before returning to the UK in 1984. He later moved to Canada and now lives in Copenhagen, Denmark. He is also a full member of British Equity and Danish Actors' Union.

He landed his first role in the 1994 film Prince of Jutland as Hother. He also played the part of a young sailor in the 1996 film Breaking the Waves, along with the main role in the 2002 short film Debutanten.

In the Hitman game series, Bateson provided the voice of Agent 47 and in every entry in the series until the fifth game, Hitman: Absolution, when he stated to a member of a Hitman fan forum that "No one from IO Interactive is answering my calls, e-mails or SMS." Bateson would later officially confirm on his personal website that he had been "unceremoniously dropped from the franchise", and added that he was unable to make further comments due to "legal reasons". Bateson did eventually return as the voice of Agent 47 in Hitman: Absolution. On 16 June 2015, just one day after the announcement of Hitman (2016), Bateson confirmed that he would once again be voicing Agent 47 in the new title via Twitter.

Bateson also voiced Virgil in the 2020 indie game Lightmatter, his first non-Hitman video game voice role.

Filmography
Den Enes Død (1994)
Carl Th. Dreyer: My Métier (1995) (documentary) 
Kun en Pige (1995) – Korrespondent
Krystalbarnet (1996)
Spoon River (1996)
Another You (1997)
Midnight Angels (1998)
Debutanten (2002) (short) - Bill
Langt fra Las Vegas (2001–2003) – Irer
A Royal Family (TV, 2003) – Narrator (English version)
The Core (2005) (documentary) – Niels Bohr
Hero of God (2006)
Anna Pihl (TV, 1 episode, 2008) – Mr.Reed
Klovn (TV, 1 episode, 2008) – Dave
Disco Ormene (2008) – Voice
Maj & Charlie (TV, 1 episode, 2008) – Fitness Chef
Aurum (2008) – Mark Boland
Livvagterne (TV, 5 episodes, 2010) – Shane
The Dark Side of Chocolate (2010) (documentary) - Narrator
Borgen (TV, 2 episodes, 2010 - 2011) – Additional voices
The Micro Debt (2011) (documentary) - Narrator
The Life and Death of Thomas Simeon (2011) – Narrator (voice)
A Tribute to J. J. Abrams (2013) (short) – Voice of Bouncer
Taming the Quantum World (2013) (documentary) - Narrator
Aftenshowet (TV, 2 episodes, 2013 - 2014) – Himself
Exodus: Humanity Has A Price (2014) – Commander
Monte Carlo Elsker USA (2014) – Speaker
Upstart (2014)
Huldra: Lady of the Forest (2016) – Mike
Digital Romance (2016) (short) – Kane
Bitter Grapes (2016) (documentary) - Narrator
Ø (TV, 5 episodes, 2016) - Tommy 
Real Life Hitman (2016) (short) - Agent 47 (voice)
The Messenger (short, 2018) – Narrator / Boss
Below the Surface (TV, 1 episode, 2019) - British newsreader (voice)
Breeder (2020) - Speaker
Kamikaze (TV, 1 episode, 2021) - Bengt
The Orchestra (TV, 3 episodes, 2022) - Mablewood
The Exigency II: Course of Action (TBA) - Hideout Guard (voice)

Film

Video games

References

External links
 
 
 

1960 births
Living people
English expatriates in Denmark
English male voice actors
English male comedians
English male film actors
English male stage actors
English male television actors
English male video game actors
English television presenters
People from Durban
South African people of British descent
University of Natal alumni
White South African people